This article lists the Scottish National Party's election results in UK parliamentary elections.

Summary of general election performance

Election results

1935 general election

By-elections, 1935–45

1945 general election

By-elections, 1945–50

1950 general election

1951 general election

By-elections, 1951–55

1955 general election

1959 general election

By-elections, 1959–64

1964 general election

1966 general election

By-elections, 1966–70

1970 general election

By-elections,  1970–74

February 1974 general election

October 1974 general election

By-elections,  1974–79

1979 general election

By-elections,  1979–83

1983 general election

1987 general election

By-elections, 1987–92

1992 general election

By-elections,  1992–97

1997 general election

By-elections,  1997–2001

2001 general election

2005 general election

By-elections,  2005–10

2010 general election

By-elections,  2010–15

2015 general election

2017 general election

2019 general election

References

Peter Lynch, SNP: The History of the Scottish National Party
Richard Ramsay, A Guide to Post-War Scottish By-Elections to the UK Parliament

Scottish National Party
Election results by party in the United Kingdom